Methley Perseverance F.C. was an English football club based in Methley, West Yorkshire.

History
The club won the Yorkshire Football League title in 1924 and 1926.

References

Yorkshire Football League
Defunct football clubs in England
Defunct football clubs in West Yorkshire